Thoralf Hagen (22 September 1887 – 7 January 1979) was a Norwegian rowing coxswain who competed in the 1920 Summer Olympics.

In 1920 he won the bronze medal as coxswain of the Norwegian boat in the coxed four competition as well as in the eight.

References

External links
profile

1887 births
1979 deaths
Norwegian male rowers
Olympic rowers of Norway
Rowers at the 1920 Summer Olympics
Olympic bronze medalists for Norway
Olympic medalists in rowing
Medalists at the 1920 Summer Olympics
Coxswains (rowing)